The first government of Juan Manuel Moreno was formed on 22 January 2019, following the latter's election as President of the Regional Government of Andalusia by the Parliament of Andalusia on 16 January and his swearing-in on 18 January, as a result of the People's Party (PP) and Citizens (Cs) being able to muster a majority of seats in the Parliament with external support from Vox following the 2018 Andalusian regional election.

The cabinet comprised members of the PP and Cs, as well as a number of independents proposed by both parties. It was automatically dismissed on 20 June 2022 as a consequence of the 2022 regional election, but remained in acting capacity until the next government was sworn in.

Investiture

Council of Government
The Council of Government was structured into the offices for the president, the vice president and 11 ministries.

Notes

References

2019 establishments in Andalusia
2022 disestablishments in Andalusia
Cabinets established in 2019
Cabinets disestablished in 2022
Cabinets of Andalusia